Greenwood International School is an American curriculum school based in the United Arab Emirates, Dubai. The school was founded in 2006 by Rashida Badri.

External links

Schools in Dubai